ISO 3166-2:SD is the entry for Sudan in ISO 3166-2, part of the ISO 3166 standard published by the International Organization for Standardization (ISO), which defines codes for the names of the principal subdivisions (e.g., provinces or states) of all countries coded in ISO 3166-1.

Currently for Sudan, ISO 3166-2 codes are defined for 18 states.

Each code consists of two parts, separated by a hyphen. The second part is two letters.

Current codes
Subdivision names are listed as in the ISO 3166-2 standard published by the ISO 3166 Maintenance Agency (ISO 3166/MA).

ISO 639-1 codes are used to represent subdivision names in the following administrative languages:
 (ar): Arabic
 (en): English

Click on the button in the header to sort each column.

Changes
The following changes to the entry have been announced in newsletters by the ISO 3166/MA since the first publication of ISO 3166-2 in 1998:

Codes before Newsletter II-3

See also
 Subdivisions of Sudan
 FIPS region codes of Sudan

External links
 ISO Online Browsing Platform: SD
 States of Sudan, Statoids.com

2:SD
ISO 3166-2
Sudan geography-related lists